Ballymacdermot Court Tomb is a megalithic portal tomb on Ballymacdermot Mountain in County Armagh, two miles outside Newry. The site is a scheduled monument in State care.

The site dates from between 4000 and 2500BCE and is located close to other neolithic monuments such as Ballykeel Dolmen and Clontigora Cairn.

Excavations
The tomb was excavated in 1816 by John Bell of the nearby Killevy Castle, in conjunction with the landowner, Jonathon Seavers. They reported to the Newry Magazine that they had found an urn containing pulverized bone fragments.

It was again excavated in 1962 by A. E. P. Collins and B. Wilson who discovered evidence of human cremations, flint, and ceramics. The archaeologists also discovered that some of the stones had been significantly disturbed in recent years. Local people told the survey team that this was as a result of an encounter with a U.S. Army tank during the Second World War.

References

Archaeological sites in County Armagh
Dolmens in Northern Ireland